Khezerlu (also Romanized as Kheẕerlū, Khezerlū, and Khezerloo; also known as Khadralī, Khedr ‘Alī, Khezerlū-ye Pā’īn, Khezerlū-ye Soflá, and Khidr ‘Alī) is a village in Chaldoran-e Jonubi Rural District, in the Central District of Chaldoran County, West Azerbaijan Province, Iran. At the 2006 census, its population was 458, in 93 families.

References 

Populated places in Chaldoran County